The15th Destroyer Flotilla, or Fifteenth Destroyer Flotilla, was a naval formation of the British Royal Navy from August 1916 to March 1919 and again from September 1939 to May 1945.

First World War
The flotilla was first established in August 1916 and was attached to the Grand Fleet till March 1918. It was then transferred to the Battle Cruiser Force until it was disbanded in March 1919.

Second World War
At the outset of the war the flotilla was reformed under the Commander-in-Chief, Rosyth from September to October 1939. It was then transferred to the Western Approaches Command at Plymouth until January 1941. Reassigned once again to Commander-in-Chief, Plymouth where it remained until May 1945 before it was dispersed.

Table of assignments

Captains (D) 15th Destroyer Flotilla
Incomplete list of post holders included:

References

Sources
 Anderson, Roger Charles; Carr Laughton, Leonard George; Perrin, William Gordon (2000). "15th Destroyer Flotilla which was part of Western Approaches Command". The Mariner's Mirror. Society for Nautical Research. 86: 321.
 Evans, A.S. (2010). Destroyer down : an account of HM destroyer losses, 1939–1945 (1. publ. ed.). Barnsley: Pen & Sword Maritime. .
 Harley, Simon; Lovell, Tony. (2018) "Fifteenth (Royal Navy) – The Dreadnought Project". www.dreadnoughtproject.org. Harley and Lovell, 29 May 2018. Retrieved 9 July 2018.
 Hawkins, Ian (2003). Destroyer: An Anthology of First-hand Accounts of the War at Sea, 1939–1945. London, England: Conway Maritime Press. .
 Watson, Dr Graham. (2015) "Royal Navy Organisation and Ship Deployment, World War One 1914–1918". www.naval-history.net. Gordon Smith.
 Watson, Dr Graham. (2015) "Royal Navy Organisation in World War 2, 1939–1945". www.naval-history.net. Gordon Smith.

Destroyer flotillas of the Royal Navy
Military units and formations established in 1916
Military units and formations disestablished in 1919
Military units and formations established in 1939
Military units and formations disestablished in 1945